MASC may refer to:

 Mammary analogue secretory carcinoma
 Manually Annotated Sub-Corpus
 MASC (band), a South Korean boy band
 Master of Applied Science (MASc), an academic degree